Güre is a town and summer resort in the Edremit district of Balıkesir Province in western Turkey. It is located 12 km west of Edremit, at the northern coast of Edremit Bay and on Mount Ida's foothills.

"Sarıkız Fest" is the traditional festival in the town, which is organized by the municipality between August 24 and August 26 of every year.

Links
 Municipality of Güre

References

Towns in Turkey
Populated places in Balıkesir Province